The Protestant Council of Rwanda (Conseil Protestant du Rwanda) is a Christian ecumenical organization founded in Rwanda in 1935. It is a member of the World Council of Churches, the All Africa Conference of Churches and the Fellowship of Christian Councils and Churches in the Great Lakes and Horn of Africa.

External links 
 
World Council of Churches listing

References 

Members of the World Council of Churches
Protestant organizations
Protestantism in Rwanda
National councils of churches
All Africa Conference of Churches
Christian organizations established in 1935